In tennis, the 2020 US Open Series was the seventeenth edition of the US Open Series, which comprised a group of hard court tournaments that started on August 22, 2020 in Western & Southern Open (to be held in New York City) hosting both a men's and women's event. The series was headlined by lone ATP Tour Masters 1000 and WTA Premier 5 events.

Tournament schedule
Due to the impact of the COVID-19 pandemic in sporting industry, many US Open Series tennis events were scheduled from July 13 to August 21, 2020 have been cancelled due to the outbreak of the virus as in which resulted to postpone them in the 2021 tennis season. The second week would have planned a week break to avoid conflicting with the opening ceremony of 2020 Summer Olympics, since the Olympics itself also postponed to 2021.

Week 1

ATP – Western & Southern Open (Cincinnati) 

Daniil Medvedev was the defending champion, but lost in the quarterfinals to Roberto Bautista Agut.

Novak Djokovic won the title, defeating Milos Raonic in the final, 1–6, 6–3, 6–4.

Main Draw Finals

WTA – Western & Southern Open (Cincinnati) 

Madison Keys was the defending champion but lost in the second round to Ons Jabeur.

Victoria Azarenka won the title via walkover, after Naomi Osaka withdrew from the final with a hamstring injury.

Main Draw Finals

Weeks 2-3

ATP – US Open (New York)

Rafael Nadal was the defending champion, but chose not to participate due to safety concerns related to the ongoing COVID-19 pandemic and the short amount of time between the US Open and the rescheduled European clay season.

Dominic Thiem won his first Grand Slam, defeating Alexander Zverev in the final, 2–6, 4–6, 6–4, 6–3, 7–6(8–6).

Main Draw Finals

WTA – US Open (New York)

Bianca Andreescu was the defending champion, but she withdrew before the tournament began due to travel concerns related to the ongoing COVID-19 pandemic.

Naomi Osaka defeated Victoria Azarenka in the final, 1–6, 6–3, 6–3.

Main Draw Finals

References

External links